The 2020–21 Bobsleigh World Cup was a multi-race series over a season for bobsleigh. The season started on 21 November 2020 in Sigulda, Latvia and finished on Innsbruck-Igls, Austria on 31 January 2021. The season sponsor is BMW.

For the first time, competitions for women in monobob are held in the status of the World Series, but not the World Cup. The season started on 5 December 2020 in Winterberg, Germany and finished on Königssee, Germany on 20 February 2021.

Calendar 
Below is the schedule of the 2020/21 season.

Bobsleigh World Cup

Women's Monobob World Series

Results

Two-man

Four-man

Women’s Monobob World Series

Two-woman

Standings

Two-man

Four-man

Women’s Monobob World Series  
Only best five results of each pilot were added up.

Two-woman

Medal table

Points

References 

Bobsleigh World Cup
2020 in bobsleigh
2021 in bobsleigh